Oum Rabia could refer to:
 Oum Er-Rbia River
 Oum Rabia (commune)